Ścibor z Gościeńczyc (literally: Ścibor of Gościeńczyce) (d. 4 May 1471) was a Polish Roman Catholic priest and the bishop of Płock since 1463.

He was son Jan, stolnik of Czersk. His older brothers were Andrzej z Gościeńczyc, a cześnik of Ciechanów, and Jakub z Gościeńczyc i Mińska, a castellan of Czersk.

In 1435 he became a student of the Kraków Academy (now Jagiellonian University), but there is no information that he finished study.

After the death of Paweł Giżycki, a bishop of Płock, Ścibor was elected his successor. It was against the will of Kazimierz IV Jagiellończyk, king of Poland, who supported Jakub of Sienno. As a bishop Ścibor supported the policy of princes of Mazovia.

Ścibor z Gościeńczyc died on 4 May 1471.

Footnotes

References

Bishops of Płock
1471 deaths
15th-century Roman Catholic bishops in Poland